Trần Dương Tài (born 1 August 1954) is a Vietnamese swimmer. He competed in the men's 200 metre breaststroke at the 1980 Summer Olympics.

References

External links
 

1954 births
Living people
Vietnamese male swimmers
Olympic swimmers of Vietnam
Swimmers at the 1980 Summer Olympics
Place of birth missing (living people)
Male breaststroke swimmers